Change of Our Lives is a 2013 Australian feature film using comedy and drama to demystify hepatitis B, its myths and misconceptions and set in the backdrops of the suburb of Cabramatta. It was produced and directed by Maria Tran that was commissioned by Cancer Council and Information and Cultural Exchange (ICE).

Screenings 
It was first premiered at Hoyts cinema in Wetherill Park, a suburb in Sydney to a reception of 600 audiences.
It had another screening on 29 July 2015 in Melbourne at the Horse Bazaar.
Screened at the 2014 Vietnamese International Film Festival.

Cast
Thien Nguyen as Hung
Yen Le as Mai
Ian Tran as Long
Maria Tran as Bich
Joe Le as Kai Le
Vico Thai as Dr Minh

Production 
Maria Tran facilitated workshops with project participants and developed the script with them in two weeks. The film was made in 7 days of production shooting. Post-Production was one month at Dong Tam Association.

References

2013 films
Australian independent films
2013 independent films
Australian drama films
Cabramatta, New South Wales
2013 drama films
2010s English-language films
2010s Australian films